This is a list of electoral results for the electoral district of Bendigo in Victorian state elections.

Members for Bendigo

Election Results

Elections in the 1980s

Elections in the 1970s

Elections in the 1960s

Elections in the 1950s

Elections in the 1940s

 Preferences were not distributed.

Elections in the 1930s

 Two party preferred vote was estimated.

Elections in the 1920s

References

Victoria (Australia) state electoral results by district